Havas may refer to:

Businesses
 Havas, French advertising company
 Havas Worldwide, American marketing communications agency

People
 Charles-Louis Havas (1783–1858), French writer
 Judit Magos-Havas (1951–2018), Hungarian table tennis player
 Lianne La Havas (born 1989), English folk and soul singer
 Kató Havas (1920–2018), Romanian violinist
 Frédéric Havas (born 1973), French volleyball player
 Sari Havas (born 1962), Finnish actress
 Henrik Havas (born 1949), Hungarian journalist
 Paul Havas (1940–2012), American painter

Places
 Havas, Iran, village in Iran
 Havas Kandi, village in Iran
 Pol Havas, village in Iran